Paul Adiga (born 21 March 1952) is a Ugandan field hockey player. He competed in the 1972 Summer Olympics.

References

External links
 

1952 births
Living people
Field hockey players at the 1972 Summer Olympics
Ugandan male field hockey players
Olympic field hockey players of Uganda